Paul W. Glimcher (born November 3, 1961) is an American neuroeconomist, neuroscientist, psychologist, economist, scholar, and entrepreneur. He is one of the foremost researchers focused on the study of human behavior and decision-making, and is known for his central role in founding and developing the field of neuroeconomics which takes an interdisciplinary approach to understanding how humans make decisions. Glimcher also founded the Institute for the Study of Decision Making at New York University (NYU), which he currently directs.

Glimcher holds the Julius Silver, Rosyln S. Silver and Enid Silver Winslow Chair of Neural Science at NYU in the College of Arts and Sciences where he also holds professorial appointments in Economics and Psychology, and in Neuroscience and Physiology in NYU School of Medicine. He is also the founder of the HUMAN Project, a large-scale interdisciplinary longitudinal study, and Datacubed Health, a start-up company focused on developing and marketing new Software-as-a-Service (PaaS) technologies in the healthcare industry and biomedical/behavioral research domain.

In addition to the many books and scholarly papers he's written in the field of neuroeconomics, he is the lead editor of the textbook, Neuroeconomics: Decision-Making and the Brain, now in its second edition.

Early life and education
Paul W. Glimcher was born in Boston, Massachusetts, the son of Arne and Mildred Glimcher. His father, Arne Glimcher, was the founder of the renowned New York City-based Pace Gallery, the second largest private art gallery in the world. Not as artistically inclined as his father and the family business, Paul Glimcher was always interested in science and technology from an early age.

Growing up in New York City, Glimcher attended the prestigious Dalton School in Manhattan.  In 1983 Glimcher received an A.B. magna cum laude in neuroscience from Princeton University. In 1989 he received a Ph.D. degree in neuroscience from the University of Pennsylvania, studying under the American psychologist, C. Randy Gallistel. Glimcher's was the first doctoral degree in neuroscience awarded by the University of Pennsylvania.

Glimcher's post-doctoral training was in oculomotor physiology. Working with Professor David Sparks (University of Pennsylvania) researching the brainstem and mesencephalic nuclei that control eye rotations, Glimcher uncovered evidence that structures participating in the execution of saccadic eye movements might be involved in planning those movements as well. Glimcher's earlier work focused on the identification and characterization of signals that intervene between the neural processes that engage in sensory encoding and the neural processes that engage in movement generation, which underlie decision-making.

Since that time, his methodologies have broadened to include techniques from experimental economics, behavioral economics, econometrics, and brain imaging, most notably pioneering the use of functional magnetic resonance imaging (fMRI) for behavioral research. His work has pioneered the notion of subjective value, which is widely identified as the neurobiological correlate of economic utility.

Career and role in founding Neuroeconomics
In 1994, Glimcher began work as an assistant professor in Neural Science at New York University. In 2001 he was promoted to associate professor of Neural Science and Psychology.

In 2004, he founded the Center for Neuroeconomics at New York University, one of the first research centers ever dedicated to the field. In 2006, Glimcher became an associate professor in economics in addition to his postings in neural science and psychology, and in 2008 was promoted to full Professor of Neural Science, Economics, and Psychology.  In 2010, Glimcher became the Silver Endowed Chair in Neural Science. In March 2014 the Center for Neuroeconomics became the Institute for the Study of Decision Making, reporting directly to NYU's Provost.

The field of neuroeconomics began to develop in the late 1990s as a natural out-growth of the maturation of many different disciplines––such as neuroscience, psychology, and economics––happening all at once. Glimcher was instrumental in facilitating the development of the bourgeoning of the field by recognizing these trends and understanding that future groundbreaking behavioral science research would require an interdisciplinary approach to overcome the inherent research limitations of any one discipline.  He co-authored what is often referred to as the first academic paper in neuroeconomics, with American neurobiologist, Michael Platt, which was published in the journal Nature in 1999. His first book, Decisions, Uncertainty and the Brain: The Science of Neuroeconomics (MIT Press) was published in 2003 and is often identified as the first book to use the word Neuroeconomics. That book won the PROSE Award for Best Medical Science Book of 2003.

In 2004, he founded the Center for Neuroeconomics at NYU––the first such research entity devoted to the field––while also serving as the founding president of the Society for Neuroeconomics. The Center for Neuroeconomics became the Institute for the Interdisciplinary Study of Decision Making in 2014 and Institute for the Study of Decision Making in 2017.

In 2009 he served as lead editor along with Colin Camerer, Ernst Fehr, and Russell Poldrack of the first textbook dedicated to the discipline of neuroeconomics: Neuroeconomics Decision-Making and the Brain (2008, Elsevier). That book won the 2009 PROSE Award for Excellence in the [Economic and] Social Sciences. In 2011 he published Foundations of Neuroeconomic Analysis (2011, Oxford) and, in 2014 with Ernst Fehr, completed a second edition of this textbook.

The HUMAN Project

After starting up the Institute for the Study of Decision Making in 2014, Glimcher––working with Miyoung Chun of The Kavli Foundation––also began the development of a new interdisciplinary longitudinal study sponsored by The Kavli Foundation, called the Kavli HUMAN Project. One of his signature achievements, the Kavli HUMAN Project is a “big human data” research platform that took its inspiration from big data surveys in other disciplines, in particular the astronomy community's Sloan Digital Sky Survey. The survey will study tens of thousands of Americans for decades, much like past longitudinal studies––such as the Framingham Heart Study––except that the scope of measurements and disciplines covered by The HUMAN Project eclipse any past biomedical or behavioral research longitudinal study.

Datacubed Health LLC

In 2016, in light of governmental fiscal austerity for basic research at all levels, Glimcher founded Human Project Inc., then an NYU incubator company established to develop the foundational technologies used by The HUMAN Project and commercialize those technologies to generate revenue which can in turn sustain the long-term operation of The HUMAN Project, whose funding is supplemented by limited Federal and philanthropic funding. Now called Datacubed Healthcare, its product is a Software-as-a-Service (SaaS), which can enable new methods of: data analytics for large-scale datasets; conducting clinical or basic biomedical/behavioral research; and recruiting and retaining human research subjects. Today Datacubed health sells its product to Pharma and CROs. Glimcher is currently the CSO of Datacubed Health.

Research
Glimcher's research aims to describe the neural events that underlie behavioral decision-making using tools from neuroscience, psychology, and economics. His research merges psychological and economic models with computational neuroscience, including pioneering uses of fMRI (function magnetic resonance imaging) for behavioral science, to understand how value is encoded in the brain and how the brain uses those neural representations of value to guide decision-making; for example, how the brain carries out delay discounting or action-selection in the face of both risk and ambiguity. His laboratory in NYU's Center for Neural Science uses a wide range of methods including cohort studies in experimental economics, brain imaging, and single-neuron studies in non-human animals.

His most notable contributions are in: the development of the field of neuroeconomics; studies of dopamine and reinforcement learning; elucidating the neurobiological basis of human preferences; how people make intertemporal choices; and pioneering the application of “normalized representation” to decision-making.

In 1999, with neuroscientist, Michael Platt, Glimcher was the first to demonstrate a utility-like value signal in the brain of a living creature. This finding appeared in the peer reviewed journal Nature. In 2004, with Michael Dorris, he published the first experimental test of the hypothesis that the Nash Equilibrium in strategic games specifies an internal representation of value in the peer-reviewed journal Neuron. They found that, as hypothesized by Nash, mixed strategy equilibria emerge when the subject values of options being mixed are equivalent.

Glimcher's laboratory has conducted extensive research on the brain's reward system, in particular the dopamine system and reinforcement learning. In 2005, with Hannah Bayer, he published the first quantitative test of the Dopamine Reward Prediction Error Hypothesis based on single neuron recordings from dopamine neurons and a novel kernel-based analysis in Neuron.

In 2007 Glimcher and Joe Kable were the first to demonstrate a clear subject value signal in the human brain that could be effectively disassociated from objective value signals. This finding was published in Nature Neuroscience. In 2010, with Andrew Caplin, Mark Dean and Robb Rutledge, he published the first example of an axiomatic economic analysis applied to the neurobiology of decision-making in The Quarterly Journal of Economics. This paper was also the first in a first-tier economic journal to include images of brain scans.

In 2011, with Ifat levy, Stephanie Lazzaro and Robb Rutledge, he published the first demonstration that activity patterns in the human medial prefrontal cortex, measured in the absence of choice behavior, could be used to predict later choices by the same individuals in the Journal of Neuroscience. In 2013, with Kenway Louie and Mel Win Khaw, he demonstrated that efficient compressive encoding of subjective value by neurons in the brains of monkeys predicts novel anomalies in choice behavior which they subsequently observed in both monkeys and humans. These findings were published in the Proceedings of the National Academy of Sciences.

In 2016, Glimcher and co-authors explained how a preexisting survey-based methodology for valuing public environmental goods (e.g. public parks)––“Contingent Valuation”––could be refined with a neuroeconomical approach. Glimcher et al. incorporated fMRI measurements to contrast with the outputs of traditional contingent valuation. Their research showed that the way people value environmental public goods differs on a neurobiological level from “neural activity associated with previously examined goods and preference measures”. In other words, people value environmental goods differently from other tangible goods, like food or clothing. While further research is required in this line of inquiry, the research could influence public policy and how scientists communicate with the public about dangers posed to the environment and/or shared resources.

Overall, Glimcher's research has appeared in academic journals in the fields of economics, psychology, neuroscience, as well as in general scholarly journals such as Nature, Science, and the Proceedings of the US National Academy of Sciences. He has published nearly 100 academic articles with colleagues, postdoctoral fellows, and students.

The Kavli HUMAN Project is Glimcher's signature research project, combining almost all of the elements of his research over the past three decades.

Honors and other work
Glimcher is a fellow of the American Association for the Advancement of Science and the McKnight, Whitehall, Klingenstein, and McDonnell Foundations, as well as a member of the Dana Alliance for Brain Initiatives. He is or has been an investigator of the National Eye Institute, the National Institute of Mental Health, the National Institute of Neurological Disorders and Stroke, and the National Institute on Aging. He has also won the Margaret and Herman Sokol Faculty Award in the Sciences in 2003 and NYU's Distinguished (Lifetime Accomplishment) Teaching Award in 2006.

His 2009 textbook on neuroeconomics received the American Association of Publishers PROSE Award for Excellence in the Social Sciences.

Glimcher, as an active member of the scientific community, also plays a prominent role with the U.S. National Academies of Science, Engineering, and Medicine, where he has served on numerous advisory boards and research study committees operated by the Academies, including:
 Presenter to the Social and Behavioral Sciences Decadal Survey (2016);
 Committee on Making the Soldier Decision on Future Battlefields (2013);
 Committee on Opportunities in Neuroscience for Future Army Applications (2009);
 Two terms on the Army Research Lab Technical Assessment Board.
He has also been a reviewer on multiple proposal and program review panels for the National Institutes of Health and the National Science Foundation.

Popular press
Glimcher's work has also been featured in the popular press such as Time, Newsweek,  The Los Angeles Times,   National Public Radio,  BBC, Le Monde, Frankfurter Allgemeine Zeitung, Quanta Magazine, New York Magazine, Science, NewScientist, Fast Company, Vox, and The Atlantic's CityLab.

Books

References

Economists from New York (state)
American neuroscientists
21st-century American psychologists
New York University faculty
Living people
Princeton University alumni
University of Pennsylvania alumni
Fellows of the American Association for the Advancement of Science
1961 births
Dalton School alumni
21st-century American economists
American textbook writers
20th-century American psychologists